The Women's Network for Unity is a sex worker organization in Cambodia which was established in 2000 and currently has about 6,400 members. It works against the stigmatization of sex work and lobbies for legal and human rights of sex workers and for safer working conditions. Accordingly, the organization aims to amend the 2008 Law on Suppression of Human Trafficking and Sexual Exploitation. The WNU was established by the Women's Agenda for Change Organisation that was founded by an Australian Aid Worker Rosanna Barbero.  In 1999 several women's rights in Development NGO's came together to discuss sex worker rights with the aim of creating spaces and opportunities for sex workers to be at the forefront of the development Agenda.  The WNU was sponsored, supported and received training from the WAC activist, both local and international staff.

See also
 Prostitution in Cambodia

References

External links
WNU's website

Women's organizations based in Cambodia
Sex worker organizations in Cambodia